Hawksley is an English surname. Notable people with the surname include:

Brian Hawksley (1920–2001), English actor
Charles Hawksley (1839–1917), English civil engineer
Dominic Hawksley, British actor
Dorothy Hawksley (1884–1970), British painter
Humphrey Hawksley (born 1964), British journalist
James Hawksley (born 1989), Australian rules footballer
Lucinda Hawksley (born 1970), English writer
Roy Hawksley (born 1942), English rugby league player
Thomas Hawksley (1807–1893), English civil engineer
Warren Hawksley (1943–2018), British politician
For the suburb of Birmingham, England, see Hawkesley.

English-language surnames